Wald is a German surname meaning "forest". Notable people with the surname include:

Abraham Wald (1902–1950), Hungarian mathematician of German descent
Carol Wald (1935–2000), American artist
Charles F. Wald (born 1948), American military officer
Diane Wald, American poet
Eduard Wald (1905–1978), German Resistance member, politician, unionist
Elijah Wald (born 1959), American folk blues guitarist and music historian
Florence Wald (1917–2008), "mother of the American hospice movement"
František Wald (1861–1931), German-Czech chemist
George Wald (1906–1997), American biologist and Nobel Laureate
Jerry Wald (1916–1962), American film producer and screenwriter
Karl Wald (1916–2011), German football referee
Lillian Wald (1867–1940), American nurse and social worker
Michael S. Wald, American lawyer currently the Jackson Eli Reynolds Professor of Law, Emeritus at Stanford Law School.
Nicholas Wald (born 1944), British professor, Fellow of the Royal Society
Orli Wald (1914–1962), German Resistance member, concentration camp survivor, "Angel of Auschwitz"
Patricia Wald (1928–2019), American judge
Robert Wald (born 1947), American physicist
Warren Wald (born 1980), English Pop Idol contestant

German-language surnames